The Mucky Duck Bush Band, often called Mucky Duck, is a Western Australian Australian folk and country music band or bush band formed in 1973 and still active today, in Perth and Western Australia. 
The band was founded by Stan Hastings, who ran the folk club The Stables in Northbridge, and his son Greg Hastings. They turned professional in 1978, touring around Western Australia.

In 1982 they performed a musical Moondyne Joe (about the bushranger of that name) at the Regal Theatre in Subiaco.

The group had a changing lineup over the years and in 2003 it was revealed that English writers had made the dubious claim that their lineup had included Lord Lucan.

Mucky Duck's current lineup (since 2002) is Don Blue (guitar, whistle, vocals), John Perry (bass, vocals) and Erik Kowarski (fiddle, guitar, vocals).  For some performances they are joined by Bob Emery (mandolin, guitar, vocals).

Discography and works 
 
 
 
 
 
 
 
 Mucky Duck Bush Band (2014), The Heart of Duckness, Pocket Universe
 Blue, Don (2014), Duck Tales: A History of the Mucky Duck Bush Band 1973-2013, Don Blue

References

External links 
https://www.muckyduckbushband.com/

Australian folk music groups
Musical groups established in 1974
Australian country music groups